Irene Wrenner is an American journalist and politician from the state of Vermont who has represented the Chittenden North district in the Vermont Senate since January 2023. A member of the Democratic Party, she previously served on the Essex Board of Selectmen. She founded an online newspaper, the Essex ReTorter, in 2020.

References

Living people
Democratic Party Vermont state senators
Women state legislators in Vermont
21st-century American politicians
21st-century American women politicians
Year of birth missing (living people)